The Centre is a major shopping mall located south-east of the junction of Circle Drive and 8th Street in Saskatoon, Saskatchewan in the Wildwood neighbourhood. Sometimes commonly referred to as The Centre At Circle And 8th or The 8th Street Mall It is currently anchored by Sport Chek, Saskatoon Co-op, Rainbow Cinemas, the Centre Cinemas, Shoppers Drug Mart, Best Buy, Indigo Books and Music and Dollarama. Until 2003-2005, Canadian Tire and Walmart were also part of this mall. They both moved to the big box development of Preston Crossing; a Zellers department store that had operated in the west end of the mall since it was built in the early 1970s subsequently relocated from its original location to occupy the vacated Walmart location at the east end. The Zellers has since closed and has been converted into Target, which also subsequently closed. The Centre boasts more than 90 shops and services, several art display spaces in Centre East, and a 2-level temperature-controlled underground parkade.

History

Precursors 
The Centre was created by the merging of two established shopping centres:

Wildwood Mall
Opened on April 25, 1977, Wildwood Mall (now Centre East) was only the second proper enclosed mall on the east side of Saskatoon. Its original anchor tenants were Woolco, a discount department store, and Dominion, a grocery store. The closure of Dominion in the 1980s resulted in a series of unsuccessful renovation attempts. A food court was added but sat mostly vacant (by this time the larger Circle Park Mall had already established its own food court across the street). The remainder of the former Dominion space was initially occupied by a home video rental business (Jumbo Video, which closed after a couple of years), then after 1992 by Pinder's Drugs (later Shopper's Drug Mart; after Shopper's purchased the Pinder's chain there was a period of about a year during which two SDM locations were adjacent to each other, due to there already being one in Circle Park Mall). In 1994, Woolco became Wal-Mart, around the time discussions regarding amalgamation with Circle Park Mall began in earnest. During the mid-1990s, Wildwood Mall had a large number of vacancies and came close to dead mall territory before the two malls were joined. The two movie theatres now situated on the west side of Centre East were built as part of the amalgamation and take up most of the area previously held by Dominion and the later food court/Pinders sites (the section also hosted a Dollarama store until it relocated to Centre West) in summer of 2004 a new Walmart had started construction in nearby Preston Crossing several kilometres North from Centre Mall it had completed & opened in January 2005 after the ‘04 holiday season, in spring 2006 Zellers had re-located from its original west anchor spot to the Walmart outlet and the older Zellers outlet was vacant but left open to foot traffic for the Safeway store (now Co-op) before it was demolished and re-built as a Best Buy in autumn of 2010. in the holiday season of 2012 Zellers closed its doors for the last time before renovation began in winter of 2013 renovation took seven months and Target opened in July 2013 and closed in spring on 2015, in 2016 the west quarter portion of the Target was renovated and opened an Ardene women’s clothing outlet.

County Fair Plaza and Circle Park Mall
Centre West first opened in May 1970 as County Fair Plaza. It was not a true shopping mall, but a collection of two major stores, a Zellers department store (which opened on May 28, 1970) and Canada Safeway grocery store (opening date July 14, 1970), that were joined together, along with a few smaller shops accessed via a short corridor, including a Pinder's Drug Store (later Shopper's Drug Mart) location and a bank. In 1985-1986 the mall underwent a significant expansion to become a major enclosed shopping centre, with Canadian Tire relocating from Market Mall to become an anchor tenant (that store would close in early 2003 and relocate to Preston Crossing) and a food court, plus an underground parkade. The expanded mall was rebranded Circle Park Mall. In the mid-1990s, Circle Park and Wildwood malls merged to form The Centre.

Post-merger 
In 1995, the two malls were connected by an underground link under Acadia Drive (after the city rejected a proposal for an at-grade extension that would have resulted in Acadia, a major access route into the Wildwood and Lakeview communities, being closed to traffic). The two "sides" of the mall are now known as "Centre East" and "Centre West". Target Canada briefly operated a store at in Centre East, replacing Zellers (which had previously relocated from its longtime position anchoring Centre West after Wal-Mart pulled out of its Centre East location). Its space has since been reallocated to smaller tenants such as clothing chain Ardene and GoodLife Fitness. In the late-2000s, the former Zellers location in Centre West was repurposed for several smaller retailers and a Best Buy anchor store. As part of this renovation, the Canada Safeway, which was previously accessed through Zellers, was converted into a standalone store, no longer joined physically to the mall. Around this time a standalone block of shops including a branch of Indigo Books and Music was constructed along the north side of the property; although not physically connected to the rest of the mall, these retailers are considered part of The Centre.

Following its merger with Sobeys, the Safeway grocery store was divested to Saskatoon Co-op, who moved its 8th Street food store to the mall.

In May 2018, it was announced that Cineplex would open a new seven-screen cinema on the property in 2019, replacing its existing Cineplex Odeon Centre Cinemas location inside the mall. It was concurrently announced that Rainbow Cinemas, the mall's neighbouring second-run cinema, would shut down in 2020, as the mall's owners had declined to renew its lease due to an exclusivity agreement with Cineplex. The new cinema, which maintains a corridor connection to the mall, opened October 25, 2019. In 2019, renovation work began in Centre East (including the tunnel connection under Acadia Drive) in preparation for redevelopment of the soon-to-be-vacated theatres.

Anchor Tenants
Best Buy Canada
Saskatoon Co-op grocer (Stand Alone Store)
Sport Check
Shoppers Drug Mart
Atmosphere
Indigo (Stand alone store)
Dollarama
Cineplex Cinemas
Urban Planet
Ardene
Good Life Fitness

Former Anchor Tenants

Canada Safeway
Zellers
Canadian Tire
Petsmart
Dominion
Woolco Canada 
Wal-Mart Canada
Target Canada

See also
 List of shopping malls in Saskatoon

References

Shopping malls in Saskatchewan
Shopping malls established in 1995
Buildings and structures in Saskatoon
Tourist attractions in Saskatoon
1995 establishments in Saskatchewan